What Kind of Fool Am I and Other Show-Stoppers is a 1962 studio album by Sammy Davis Jr.

Reception 

Riding off the success of the title single which was at #18 on the Billboard Hot 100 after 8 weeks on the chart, the album entered the Billboard Top LPs chart at #82 in the end of October 1962. It peaked at #14, staying on the chart for 22 weeks, the last of which was the week Davis' 1963 live album Sammy Davis Jr. at the Cocoanut Grove entered the Top LPs chart.

Lindsay Planer on AllMusic praised the album for "accentuating [Davis'] undeniable talent and presence," and noted that it was one of the most well-received albums he released during the 1960s.

Track listing

Personnel 
 Sammy Davis Jr. – vocals
 Marty Paich - director

References 

1962 albums
Covers albums
Sammy Davis Jr. albums
Reprise Records albums